Scariff Island is an island  of the Atlantic Ocean belonging to County Kerry, Ireland.

Geography
The island is 366 acres; its highest hill is at 252 m.
It's located in the Atlantic Ocean at around 1 km from Deenish Island and 7 km from Hogs Head, on the mainland.

History
In 1837 only one family lived on Scariff; their main work was to care the cattle which grazed on the island. On the summit of the hill there were remains of an ancient hermitage and, on the east side, ruins of a church.
1911 census does not report any inhabitant for Scariff Island.

See also
 List of islands of Ireland

References

External links

Scariff and Deenish, page on irishislands.info
The island page on iscoverireland.ie

Islands of County Kerry
Uninhabited islands of Ireland
Marilyns of Ireland